A volumetric haptic display (VHD) is similar to a (visual) volumetric display, but informs touch instead of vision. A VHD projects a touch-based representation of a surface onto a 3D volumetric space. Users can feel the projected surface(s), usually with their hands. The display is otherwise not detectable, and offers no visual feedback. There are no known instances of a fully operational VHD at this time.

Technological implementation

The University of Bristol has developed a method for haptic feedback that could be integrated into a volumetric display. The system uses focused ultrasound to create a haptic object in mid air.

Feedback

The following feedback can be provided to the user:
Surface contact
Surface texture
Vibration
Motion-based/topological changes of surface

See also

Optacon (two-dimensional)
Refreshable Braille Display (two-dimensional).
Wired glove (partial 3D representation).

References

Belexes research project in the Centre for Music Technology at the University of Glasgow.
 "Researchers in Japan have developed a display that makes 3D objects solid enough to grasp."

Display technology
Haptic technology